Top Country Albums is a chart that ranks the top-performing country music albums in the United States, published by Billboard.  In 1990, seven different albums topped the chart, based on sales reports submitted by a representative sample of stores nationwide.

In the issue of Billboard dated January 6, Randy Travis was at number one with the album No Holdin' Back, its 10th week in the top spot.  It remained at number one through the issue dated January 20 before being displaced by Killin' Time by Clint Black.  Black's album had spent six weeks at number one the previous fall before No Holdin' Back replaced it atop the chart; it would have three separate spells in the top spot between January and October 1990 and add a further 25 weeks to its total, making it the second-longest-running Top Country Albums number one to date.  Black returned to number one in December with Put Yourself in My Shoes, which was the final number one of the year.  Travis also achieved two number ones in 1990, as he spent a single week in the top spot in November with Heroes & Friends; it was his fifth number one in a little over four years but would be his final appearance in the top spot.

In October, Garth Brooks reached number one for the first time with No Fences.  Over the next two and a half years Brooks would dominate the top of the Top Country Albums chart, spending a total of 90 weeks at number one with No Fences and his subsequent two albums.  In addition to his success on both the country music albums and singles charts, Brooks would experience a level of mainstream popularity and success unprecedented for a country artist; by the following year No Fences was recognized as the highest-selling country album of all time, and by 2019 it had sold 17 million copies.  Brooks is ranked by the Recording Industry Association of America as the best-selling solo albums artist in the United States of any genre with more than 130 million domestic units sold by 2015, second only to the Beatles in overall album sales.

Chart history

References

1990
1990 record charts